Chapin School is an all-girls independent day school in New York City's Upper East Side neighborhood in Manhattan.

History 

Maria Bowen Chapin opened "Miss Chapin's School for Girls and Kindergarten for Boys and Girls" in 1901. The school originally enrolled 78 students, who were taught by seven teachers. It developed from a small elementary school Chapin and Alice Wetmore founded in 1894 that was explicitly intended to prepare young girls for success at the Brearley School, which had been created 10 years earlier. Chapin ran the educational side of "Primary Classes for Girls" and Wetmore ran the business end. The two ended their partnership in 1901, and Miss Chapin's School was born.

Chapin's first high school diplomas were granted in 1908, and the last boys attended in 1917.

According to archival sources recounted in And Cheer for the Green and Gold, Chapin was an early feminist and suffragette who focused heavily on character development and intended the school to offer the same classical education as was available to boys of that era.

Chapin remained headmistress until 1932. At her request, the school was renamed the Chapin School after she died, in 1934.

Chapin is at 100 East End Avenue, at East 84th Street. Chapin's school was originally at 12 West 47th Street. In 1905 the school moved to East 58th Street. In 1910 it moved to East 57th Street. The school has been at its current location on the Upper East Side since 1928.

Heads of School 
1901–1932: Maria Bowen Chapin
1932–1935: Mary Cecelia Fairfax§
1932–1959: Ethel Grey Stringfellow§
1959–1993: Mildred Jeanmaire Berendsen
1993–2003: Sandra Theunick
2003–2020: Patricia T. Hayot
2020–present: Suzanne Fogarty

§ joint headmistresses, 1932–1935

Academics, activities, and athletics 
Chapin's 802 students are split into three divisions: Lower School (kindergarten through grade 3), Middle School (grades 4 through 7), and Upper School (grades 8 through 12).

Around sixty students start in kindergarten, where they are divided into three classes. Each K class has two teachers, with regular use of teaching specialists (e.g., reading, Spanish, art, music, science, technology, gym, etc.)

There are about 265 students in the Upper School (8th through 12th grades), where they are taught by 53 faculty members. Traditionally, Chapin did not make an effort to replace students who left the school (generally for boarding and coed schools), leading to graduating classes of around 40. Class numbers have changed, so that now many grades contain 65–70 students. A few students are added every year or two, often to compensate for students leaving, and 6–10 are added in 6th grade. The number of students added in 7th and 8th grade varies, but a larger number are added in 9th grade, usually more than is necessary to compensate for the students leaving the school, increasing the class size.

While the lower school program combines progressive and traditional characteristics, the upper school curriculum is considered to be a traditionally rigorous liberal arts program. There are multiple requirements, including at least one modern language and two years of Latin. The Latin requirement is fulfilled in the 7th and 8th grade, and not required for those joining the school past that. The languages offered in addition to Latin are Spanish, French, and Mandarin. While Chapin used to offer AP classes, they were phased out in recent years, and the school focuses on advanced courses of their own design. Electives are called FOCUS courses, and are offered to students starting in 10th grade.

Many students do independent studies or study abroad programs, particularly through Chapin's exchange programs with the St. Hilda's Anglican School for Girls (Perth, Australia) and the American Community Schools (Athens, Greece). Since 2011, Chapin has worked with the Kibera School for Girls in Nairobi, Kenya, developing curriculum ideas and visiting each other's campuses. Chapin is also a charter affiliate member of the Online School for Girls (OSG), in which students can take courses offered to more than 30 girls' schools across the country. New York Interschool courses are offered in advanced math, leadership, and ethics. Mentorship derives from multiple sources, including faculty advisors and peer leaders.

While many Chapin students live on the Upper East Side near the school, others hail from other parts of Manhattan, as well as Brooklyn, Queens, the Bronx, New Jersey, Westchester, and Long Island.

The student-to-teacher ratio is 6.8 to 1. Twenty-one percent of the students receive tuition assistance, amounting to over $5 million per year.

Among the 21 Chapin activities are the student government (advisory), the student newspaper, the literary magazine, Amnesty International, the Gay-Straight Alliance, the Model UN, and groups dedicated to the study and performance of Classics, dance, drama, music, math, media, the environment, and science. Students are also welcome to start up new clubs during the school year.

There are 18 athletic teams at Chapin, including 15 varsity sports. The Gators compete in the Athletic Association for Independent Schools (AAIS), which is a league composed of the Brearley School, Chapin, Friends Seminary, Hewitt School, Marymount School, Nightingale Bamford School, Packer Collegiate Institute, Convent of the Sacred Heart, Saint Ann's School, and Spence School. Chapin varsity sports include badminton, basketball, cross country, fencing, field hockey, golf, gymnastics, indoor track, lacrosse, soccer, squash, swimming, tennis, track and volleyball.

Traditions 

The school's motto is Fortiter et Recte (Bravely and Rightly).

The wheel on the school's seal was chosen by the school's founder because it is the symbol for Saint Catherine of Alexandria, the patron saint of philosophers, thinkers, and educated women. The students leave assembly in a wheel pattern.

Chapin was fond of plants, which led to the school's early construction of a greenhouse within the building. Lower schoolers care for its plants during holidays, and kindergarten applicants are given a Chapin plant during the interview process.

From its beginning, the Chapin School educated students from some of the most affluent and socially prominent families in New York. At the same time, the school has long focused on the importance of serving the surrounding community and on feminism. In 1923, for example, the Alumnae Association created a babies clinic and a health clinic for the disadvantaged. Scholarship funds began to be collected during the Great Depression; proceeds of this fundraising allowed students to continue in school despite the economic turmoil of the 1930s. Seniors (or "Twelves") were offered a course on the status and work of women beginning in the 1940s. Mildred Berendsen was headmistress during the tumultuous 1960s, and she became an early board member of A Better Chance and Early Steps, both of which had just been created to encourage and prepare students of color for private schools. She would later be involved in an even more successful program, Prep for Prep. The first African-American student enrolled at Chapin in 1967. Within three years, there would be 17 African American students at the school. Thirty-eight percent of Chapin students in 2016 are young women of color.

The specifics of the school uniform have steadily evolved since 1914. As of 2017, the uniform depends upon the girl's grade level, but green is a recurrent sartorial theme. Due to coronavirus, the uniform is no longer required past the 8th grade, and instead a basic dress code is followed by the upper school students.

Chapin has had a tradition of green/gold competitions since at least 1912. Throughout the year, but especially on the annual Field Day, these green and gold teams fiercely compete until a winner is announced at the end of each school year. Students join their team in 4th grade—when applicable, joining the team of their mother or grandmother—and remain on the same team throughout their time at Chapin.

Commencement ceremonies have remained unchanged for a century. Students wear white dresses and stand together with no differentiation made. No academic awards are given, and there has never been a Chapin valedictorian.

Chapin has affiliations and competitions with a variety of other New York City schools, often through New York Interschool. Chapin is most closely aligned and rivalrous, however, with the neighboring Brearley School, with which it shares some classes, after-school programs, homecoming, and a robotics team.

Chapin also chooses to divide their school into sections. The lower school, for students in grades K-3, is centered around a class of 20 students with two teachers and specialists in various areas such as music and PE. In middle school, grades 4–7, students begin to travel around the building to different classes with different students and peers, but the whole grade shares a teacher in one subject area and takes the same curriculum. The high school at Chapin starts in 8th grade, providing a kind of preparation year for students to acclimate to the freedom and expectations of upper school.

Facilities 
All Chapin programs exist under one roof.

Annenberg Library 
The building features the two-story Annenberg Library with over 45,000 volumes and rooms for multimedia and video editing. The library also contains a 3D printing and vinyl cutting room, three student study rooms, a student conference room, multiple lounge and table areas amongst the bookshelves, and a multi-media room. There is also a separate lower-school library.

Classrooms and gyms 
As of 2015, Chapin featured 49 classrooms, eight science laboratories, four art studios including a photography darkroom and a ceramics studio, two music studios, a black box theater, a dance studio, two computer laboratories, four gymnasiums and a greenhouse.

Additional facilities 
Chapin students make frequent use of Carl Schurz Park, which is located across the street from the school, as well as Asphalt Green Aquatics Center, which is six blocks away.

In 2008, construction at Chapin provided new facilities for art, language, science and the greenhouse via expansion of the fifth and sixth floors and addition of the seventh and eighth floors.

A further round of construction began in May 2015. The new Lower Level Dining Room, a dining space for classes K-5 and multipurpose room, was completed in 2016. When the entire project is completed, Chapin will have grown from 8 to 11 stories and will have a top-floor regulation-size gymnasium to complement its four current gyms, a rooftop turf practice field and fitness center, expanded performing arts facilities, much larger dining facilities, and additional classrooms to provide more flexibility and experiential learning. Chapin's construction project has drawn opposition from neighbors, who have objected to its scale, its length, and the noise level, among other issues.

College placement and rankings 
Chapin is typically ranked among the top private schools in the United States. An article in The Wall Street Journal ranked Chapin's college placement as third best in the country. Another organization ranked private high schools from around the world based on matriculation to Ivy League colleges, plus MIT, Stanford, Oxford, and Cambridge; they bundled groups of schools, and the top 5 schools were all in NYC (Chapin was joined by Brearley, Collegiate, Saint Ann's School, and Trinity). A different 2019 survey ranked Chapin as the 4th best girls school in the country, and the 18th best K-12 private school in the country.

During the last five years (2015–2019), the approximately 250 graduates have matriculated to over 60 colleges and universities. The most commonly-attended universities: Cornell (15), Duke (12), Georgetown (12), University of Pennsylvania (12), University of Chicago (11), Harvard (10), Brown (9), Princeton (9), and New York University (8).

Notable alumnae 
For students who left Chapin early, the year below refers to the anticipated graduation year.

Theodora Mead Abel, 1917. Psychology professor. Author, Culture and Psychotherapy.
Mary Abbott, 1939. Painter. Member, New York School of Abstract Expressionists.
Amy Bach, 1986. Lawyer, civil rights journalist. Author, Ordinary Injustice: How America Holds Court.
Elizabeth Bailey, 1956. Economist. John C. Hower Professor, Wharton School. Member, American Academy of Arts and Sciences.
Lake Bell, 1998. Model. Actress, Boston Legal, Million Dollar Arm, The Secret Life of Pets. Filmmaker, In a World....
Barbara Bennett, 1924. Stage and film actress. Dancer. Literary representative.
Constance Bennett, 1922. Stage, radio, television and film actress. Star of What Price Hollywood?, Topper, and Two-Faced Woman.
Joan Bennett, 1928. Stage, film, and television actress. Star of Man Hunt, The Woman in the Window, and Dark Shadows.
Tonya Bolden, 1976. Author of children's non-fiction such as Pathfinders: The Journeys of 16 Extraordinary Black Souls
Patricia Bosworth, 1951. Journalist, biographer. Actress, model. Managing editor, Harper's Bazaar.
Elizabeth Mills Brown, 1934. Architectural historian. Author, New Haven: A Guide to Architecture and Urban Design.
Jacqueline Bouvier, 1947. First Lady of the United States. Editor.
Sunny von Bülow, 1950. Socialite, legal catalyst.
Doris Caesar, 1910. Expressionist sculptor
Stockard Channing, 1962. Actress: stage, film, television 
Frances Sergeant Childs, 1919. Historian. Founding faculty member, Brooklyn College. Author, French Refugee Life in the United States, 1790–1800: An American Chapter of the French Revolution (1940).
Hope Cooke, 1958. Queen of Sikkim. Journalist, urban historian, lecturer
Tricia Nixon Cox, 1964. Board member, medical and Republican causes
Cusi Cram, 1985. Model. Actor, One Life to Live. Writer, Arthur, The Big C, The Octonauts.
Caresse Crosby, 1909. "Literary godmother" to the Lost Generation in Paris. Co-founder, Black Sun Press. Inventor, the bra.
Lindsay Crouse, 1967. Actress: stage, film, television 
Fernanda Eberstadt, 1978. Novelist, essayist, critic. Author, Isaac and His Devils, Rat, and The Furies.
Julie Nixon Eisenhower, 1966. Editor. Author, Pat Nixon: the Untold Story.
Brenda Frazier, 1939. Socialite. "Poor Little Rich Girl"
Alix M. Freedman, 1975. Pulitzer Prize-winning journalist. Ethics editor, Thomson Reuters
Virginia Gilder, 1976. Entrepreneur, writer. Co-owner, WNBA's Seattle Storm. Olympic silver medalist in rowing. Author, Course Correction: A Story of Rowing and Resilience in the Wake of Title IX
Neva Goodwin Rockefeller, 1962. Economist. Series editor, Evolving Values for a Capitalist World. Philanthropist.
Isabella Greenway, 1904. Rancher, businesswoman, politician. First Arizona congresswoman.
Eileen Rockefeller Growald, 1970. Venture philanthropist
Anna Roosevelt Halsted, 1924. Journalist, editor, administrator
Deborah Hautzig, 1974. Writer. Author, Hey, Dollface and the Little Witch series for children
Amanda Hearst, 2002. Fashion model, socialite, activist, magazine editor, Marie Claire.
Frances Hellman, 1974. Physicist. Dean, Division of Mathematics and Physical Sciences, University of California, Berkeley
Malvina Hoffman, 1903. Sculptor. Author, Heads and Tales.
Helen Hooker, 1923. Sculptor, painter, national tennis champion, philanthropist
Alexandra Isles, 1963. Documentary filmmaker, Porraimos: Europe's Gypsies in the Holocaust. Actress, Dark Shadows
Theodora Keogh, 1937. Dancer, novelist, adventurer. Author, Meg: The Secret Life of an Awakening Girl.
Alexandra Kotur, 1988. Journalist. Style Director, Vogue. Creative Director, Town and Country.
Nicola Kraus, 1992. Writer. Co-author, The Nanny Diaries.
Aerin Lauder, 1988. Businesswoman. Creative director, Estée Lauder. Co-author, Beauty at Home.
Jane Lauder, 1991. Businesswoman. Global director, Estée Lauder.
Ruth du Pont Lord, 1939. Psychotherapist, arts patron. Author, Henry F. du Pont and Winterthur: A Daughter's Portrait.
Anne Morrow Lindbergh, 1924. Writer, aviator. Author, Gift from the Sea and North to the Orient.<ref name="biography">"Anne Morrow Lindbergh." Biography.com." Retrieved: November 17, 2011.</ref>
Sarah Lyall, 1991. Journalist, The New York Times. Author, The Anglo Files: A Field Guide to the British.
Emma Fordyce MacRae, 1905. Representational painter. Member, the Philadelphia Ten
Abby Rockefeller Mauzé, 1921. Philanthropist
Neylan McBaine, 1995. Writer. Author, How to Be a Twenty-First Century Pioneer Woman. Editor, Mormon Women Project.
Cynthia McClintock, 1963. Professor, George Washington University. Author, Revolutionary Movements in Latin America.Lynden B. Miller, 1956. Public garden designer and author
Maud Morgan, 1921. Abstract expressionist painter
Andrea Blaugrund Nevins, 1980. Journalist, documentary filmmaker. The Other F WordSheila Nickerson, 1960. Writer. Poet laureate, Alaska. Author, Disappearance: A Map and The Song of the Soapstone Carver.Galt Niederhoffer, 1994. Producer, director, novelist, screenwriter. Prozac Nation, The Romantics.
Queen Noor of Jordan (Lisa Halaby), 1969. Activist, writer. President, United World Colleges
 Jennifer "DJ" (Berinstein) Nordquist, 1985. Government, international organization, and think tank executive.
Maud Oakes, 1922. Ethnologist, artist, writer. Author, The Two Crosses of Todos Santos: Survivals of Mayan Religious Ritual.
Sister Parish (Dorothy May Kinnicutt), 1928. Interior designer
Betty Parsons, 1918. Abstract painter, art collector, art dealer
Cosima von Bülow Pavoncelli, 1985. Socialite, philanthropist
Joan Whitney Payson, 1921. Art collector. Co-owner, Greentree Stable. Owner, the New York Mets. Philanthropist.
Georgia Pellegrini, 1998. Hunter, chef, writer. Author, Modern Pioneering and Girl HunterAdela Peña, 1981. Violinist, founding member of the internationally known Naumburg Award-winning Eroica Trio.
Rosamond Pinchot, 1922. Actress. "Loveliest woman in America."
Lilly Pulitzer, 1949. Fashion designer
Lee Radziwill, 1951. Socialite, Public relations consultant and interior designer
Blanchette Ferry Rockefeller, 1927. Philanthropist. President, Museum of Modern Art.
Eileen Rockefeller, 1970. Venture philanthropist. Author, Being a Rockefeller, Becoming Myself: A Memoir.Samantha Ronson, 1995. Singer-songwriter, deejay
Margot Roosevelt, 1968. Journalist
Laura Rothenberg, 1999. Writer. Author, Breathing for a LivingEdith Finch Russell, 1918. Biographer. Author, Carey Thomas of Bryn Mawr.
Rachel Rutherford, 1994. Dancer. Soloist, New York City Ballet.
Lilian Swann Saarinen, 1930. Sculptor, illustrator, Olympic skier.
Najla Said, 1992. Writer, actor, playwright. Author, Looking for Palestine: Growing Up Confused in an Arab-American FamilyLydia Sargent, 1959. Feminist activist. Co-founder, South End Press and Z Magazine. Author, I Read About My Death in Vogue Magazine.
Louise Serpa, 1943. Rodeo photographer
Delia Sherman, 1968. Fantasy writer, editor. Author, The Porcelain Dove and The Freedom Maze.
Gladys Vanderbilt Széchenyi, 1904. Heiress
Ivanka Trump, 2000. Businesswoman. Executive Vice President, the Trump Organization
Nancy Tuckerman, 1947. Social secretary for Jackie Bouvier Kennedy, 1963–1994. Co-author, revised edition of Amy Vanderbilt's Complete Book of Etiquette.
Anne Walker, 1991. Architectural historian. Co-author, The Architecture of Delano & Aldrich and The Finest Rooms in America.Challis Walker, 1930. Sculptor, painter
Vera Wang, 1967. Former senior editor, Vogue. Fashion designer
Sigourney Weaver, 1968. Actress, producer
Aileen Osborn Webb, 1910. Philanthropist. Founder, American Craft Council
Betty Wei, 1949. Historian. Author, Old Shanghai and Liu Chi-Wen: biography of a revolutionary leader.Christine Todd Whitman, 1964. Politician, lobbyist. Former Governor of New Jersey
Dorothy Payne Whitney, 1904. Social activist. Co-founder, The New Republic and the New School for Social Research
Helen Whitney, 1961. Documentary filmmaker, First Edition, Faith and Doubt at Ground Zero, and The Mormons.
Lauren Willig, 1995. Historical novelist. Author, Pink Carnation series and The Forgotten Room.
Jane Wyatt, 1928. Actress, Father Knows Best References 

Noerdlinger, Charlotte Johnson. And Cheer for the Green and Gold: An Anecdotal History of the Chapin School''. New York: The Chapin School, 2000.

External links 

The Chapin School, official website

Girls' schools in New York City
Upper East Side
Private elementary schools in Manhattan
Private middle schools in Manhattan
Private high schools in Manhattan
Delano & Aldrich buildings